Linda Ann Orange ( Smith; September 25, 1950 – November 20, 2019) was an American politician who was a Democratic member and deputy speaker of the Connecticut House of Representatives. Orange represented the 48th Assembly District, which consists of portions of Colchester, Lebanon, Mansfield, and Windham.

In 2014, Orange, who was repeatedly endorsed by the National Rifle Association, faced a Democratic primary challenge over her stance on gun control.

Orange died from pancreatic cancer on November 20, 2019, at the age of 69.

Electoral history

References

1950 births
2019 deaths
People from Colchester, Connecticut
Politicians from Hartford, Connecticut
Deaths from pancreatic cancer
Women state legislators in Connecticut
Democratic Party members of the Connecticut House of Representatives
21st-century American women politicians
21st-century American politicians
20th-century American women politicians
20th-century American politicians